Mystus falcarius is a species of catfish endemic to India and Myanmar and is known only from Irrawaddy River, Great Tenasserim River and Chindwin River. The exact population is not known but is thought to be abundant and no exact threats are known thus Least Concern by the IUCN; it is fished for food.

References
Ng, H.H. 2010. Mystus falcarius. The IUCN Red List of Threatened Species. Version 2015.1. <www.iucnredlist.org>. Downloaded on 9 June 2015.

External links
FishBase profile

Bagridae
Fish described in 2005
Catfish of Asia